In 1962, the U.S. Navy issued a requirement for a long-range high-precision air-to-surface missile. The missile, named the AGM-53A Condor, was to use a television guidance system with a data link to the launching aircraft similar to the system of the then projected AGM-62 Walleye.

Development history
Because of numerous problems in the development phase, the first flight of an XAGM-53A missile did not occur before March 1970. 

The AGM-53 program was cancelled in March 1976. Its long range and potentially high precision made the Condor a very powerful weapon, but it was much more expensive than contemporary tactical air-to-ground weapons. The secure data link contributed a significant portion to total missile cost, and it certainly didn't help that this link was still somewhat unreliable.

Description
The Condor was to be a long-range missile to be used for high-precision stand-off attacks. When the AGM-53 approached the expected target position, the image of the TV camera in the missile's nose was transmitted back to the operator in the launching aircraft. The operator could switch between wide and narrow field-of-view images to find a suitable target.

As soon as a target for the missile had been selected, the operator could either fly the missile manually until impact, or lock the Condor on the target and rely on the missile's capability to home on the final aiming point. The Condor's linear shaped charge warhead detonated on impact.

A variant of the Condor was anticipated to carry the W73 nuclear warhead, a derivative of the B61 nuclear bomb. Details on the W73 are poorly documented, and it never entered production or service.

Operators
:  The AGM-53 was cancelled before entering service.

References

Friedman, Norman (1983). US Naval Weapons. Conway Maritime Press.
Gunston, Bill (1979). The Illustrated Encyclopedia of Rockets and Missiles. Salamander Books Ltd.
Pretty, R.T; Archer, D.H.R. (eds.) (1973). Jane's Weapon Systems 1972–73. Jane's Information Group.

AGM-053
Abandoned military rocket and missile projects of the United States